Charles Sparks Thomas (September 28, 1897 – October 17, 1983) was an American politician who served as Secretary of the Navy from 1954 to 1957.

Thomas was born in Independence, Missouri, and he attended the University of California and Cornell University. During World War I, he served as a naval aviator. He joined the Eisenhower Administration in 1953 as Undersecretary of the Navy; later that year, he designated an Assistant Secretary of Defense.

During the 1930s, Thomas worked for Foreman and Clark.  Thomas became president of Trans World Airlines on 2 July 1958, and served until 28 July 1960. He subsequently was the president of the Irvine Company, which developed sprawling Southern California suburbs, through 1966. Thomas was director of several large corporations, including Lockheed.

References

External links

(PDF) National Defense University

1897 births
1983 deaths
United States Secretaries of the Navy
Trans World Airlines people
United States Under Secretaries of the Navy